Lynden Sculpture Garden (formerly the Bradley Sculpture Garden) is a 40-acre outdoor sculpture park located at 2145 West Brown Deer Road in Milwaukee, Wisconsin in Milwaukee County. Formerly the estate of Harry Lynde Bradley and Margaret (Peg ) Blakney Bradley, Lynden is home to the collection of more than 50 monumental sculptures collected by Margaret Bradley between 1962 and 1978. The collection features works by Alexander Archipenko, Henry Moore, Barbara Hepworth, Clement Meadmore, Marta Pan, Tony Smith, Mark di Suvero and others sited across 40 acres of park, lake and woodland.

History
The Lynden Sculpture Garden was the estate of the late Harry Lynde Bradley and Margaret (Peg) Blakney Bradley. Harry Bradley, an inventor and industrialist, founded the Allen-Bradley Company with his brother Lynde in 1904, building it into one of the state’s most successful manufacturing concerns. Harry married Peg in April 1926, and in 1928, they purchased property about 10 miles north of downtown Milwaukee and named it "Lynden."

The Bradleys took the nearly 40 acres of flat farmland and, with the help of Chicago landscape architects Langford & Moreau, created an English country park with gently rolling hills, trees and flower beds. The lake and the rustic bridge spanning the water were designed to match Harry Bradley’s memories of the municipal grounds in Kansas City where he swam as a boy.

In April 1934 the Bradleys hired Carl Urban, a fourth generation gardener, to supervise the crew and the planting of the garden beds and trees. Trained in Germany and the United States, Urban observed that when he first saw the acreage behind the house it consisted mainly of corn fields with horses, sheep, goats and 13 oak trees. Over time, nearly 4,000 trees were planted on the property—several varieties of elms as well as Norwegian, Austrian and Scotch pines, Norway maples, a Danish plum tree, seven varieties of birch trees and Kentucky coffee trees. Urban remained on the staff and resided in the apartment in the barn until his death in 1991.

Further plans to construct a botanical garden on the site were derailed by the outbreak of World War II. In 1962, Peg Bradley—already an experienced art collector—began collecting the contemporary monumental sculptures that secured Lynden’s international reputation. She collected actively until her death in 1978.

The collection includes sculptures by Alexander Archipenko, Henry Moore, Barbara Hepworth, Clement Meadmore, Marta Pan, Tony Smith, Mark di Suvero and many others. After the works had been purchased, Peg would sit on her porch to direct the location of wood models constructed by the staff as she chose sites for the sculptures. Some of the artists travelled to Lynden to assist with the siting and to assemble their work.

The original farmhouse, built in the 1860s, was enlarged to accommodate Harry, Peg and their daughter Jane. Local architect Fitzhugh Scott provided drawings for the alterations to the barn, the bathhouse, and a diving pier and slide. Several decades later architect David Kahler designed an addition at the west end of the house for an indoor swimming pool, providing more space for the Bradleys’ growing art collection.

Opening to the public
In 2009 the board of the Bradley Family Foundation elected to open Lynden to the public. This required an extensive renovation of the house and some of the grounds. The house has been transformed by Uihlein-Wilson Architects using sustainable building practices. The newly created public spaces include a conference room, a large classroom/studio, a gallery and a glassed-in function space overlooking the large patio.

Lynden opened to the public on May 30, 2010, offering tours (docent-led and self-guided), educational programs, temporary exhibitions, and performances. It is open year-round.

List of artists and works
 Alexander Archipenko - Queen of Sheba
 Max Bill - Rhythm in Space
 Deborah Butterfield - Hara
 Samuel Buri - Des Vaches: Mo, Ni, Que
 Robert Burkert - "Butterflies"
 Aldo Calo - Orizzontale, Tensione No. 2
 Lindsay Daen - The Lovers
 Mark di Suvero - The Lovers, Poland
 Sorel Etrog - Embrace, The Source
 Charles Ginnever - Olympus
 Duayne Hatchett - Rainbow
 Bernhard Heiliger - Unfolding, Vegetative Sculpture I
 John Henry - Pin Oak I
 Barbara Hepworth - Conversations with Magic Stones, Figure Three, Magic Stone Three of Conversations with Magic Stones, Sea Form (Atlantic)
 Linda Howard - Round About, Sky Fence
 Lyman Kipp - Lodgepole
 Bernard Kirschenbaum - Twist for Max, Way Four
 Alexander Liberman - Axeltree, Orbits, Ritual II
 Heinz Mack (Macht) - Knife Tree, Three Graces ‘Thalia’ ‘Aglaia’ and ‘Euphrosyne’
 Tobias Madison & Kaspar Müller - "Bora Bora Structure for Lynden Sculpture Garden, Milwaukee"
 Gerhard Marcks - Bremen Town Musicians
 Clement Meadmore - Double Up, Upstart
 Antoni Milkowski - Salem No. 7
 Henry Moore - Large Torso, Arch, Two-Piece Reclining Figure No. 9
 Robert Murray - Windfall
 Forrest Myers - "Quartet 1967/2013"
 Masayuki Nagare - Ancestor, Bench-Stone
 Isamu Noguchi - Sinai
 Marta Pan - Floating Sculpture No. 3
 Beverly Pepper - Compound Junior
 George Rickey - Peristyle, Three Lines
 James Rosati - Untitled
 Ernest C. Shaw - Arch, Epicenter, Epicenter II, III Columns
 Arlie Sinaiko - Flight
 Tony Smith - Wandering Rocks
 George Sugarman - Trio
 Isaac Witkin - Kumo

Temporary exhibitions and performances
In addition to its permanent outdoor sculpture collection, Lynden hosts a number of temporary exhibitions and performances each year. Some of these are drawn from the Bradley Family Foundation collection, which includes paintings, works on paper and small sculptures. Others feature works by contemporary artists.

Inside/Outside was the theme of the Lynden Sculpture Garden’s 2010-2011 gallery exhibition program. This series of temporary exhibitions, which began in the summer of 2010, featured pairs of artists working in the gallery and on the grounds of the sculpture garden. Inside/Outside provided a series of opportunities for artists to reframe the permanent collection and to re-present it—and the individual works in it—to the public. This established the basis for ongoing engagement with Lynden and its collection. Exhibiting artists included Kevin Giese and Linda Wervey Vitamvas, Eddee Daniel and Philip Krejcarek, Shana McCaw and Brent Budsberg, Kevin Schlei and Lynn Tomaszewski, and Amy Cropper and Stuart Morris. The series culminated in Dressing the Monument, an international exhibition of contemporary sculpture and performances by Tobias Madison & Kaspar Müller (Switzerland); Hannah Weinberger (Switzerland); Nicholas Frank (Milwaukee); Michelle Grabner & Brad Killam (Chicago); Lucas Knipscher (New York); John Miller (New York) & Richard Hoeck (Vienna); David Robbins (Milwaukee); and Anicka Yi/Matt Sheridan Smith (New York).

Since opening to the public in 2010, Lynden has presented performances by Eiko & Koma, the Echo Park Film Center Filmmobile, WildSpace Dance Company, Nora Chipaumire, Present Music, Trisha Brown Dance Company, and Reggie Wilson/Fist and Heel Performance Group.

References

 Gurda, J. (1992). The Bradley legacy: Lynde and Harry Bradley, their company and their foundation. The Lynde and Harry Bradley Foundation, Inc.

External links
 Lynden Sculpture Garden - official site

Buildings and structures in Milwaukee
Sculpture gardens, trails and parks in the United States
Art museums and galleries in Wisconsin
Museums in Milwaukee
Gardens in Wisconsin
2010 establishments in Wisconsin
Art museums established in 2010